John McKinney (1803July 10, 1870) was a Michigan politician.

Early life
McKinney was born on 1803 in Pennsylvania. McKinney moved to Michigan in 1837, where he settled in Van Buren County.

Career
On November 1, 1847, McKinney was elected to the Michigan House of Representatives where he represented the Van Buren County district from January 3, 1848 to April 3, 1848. On November 6, 1848, McKinney was elected to the Michigan Senate where he represented the 4th district from January 1, 1849 to April 2, 1849. On November 5, 1849, McKinney was elected to another term in the Michigan Senate where he again represented the 4th district from January 7, 1850 to April 21, 1850. McKinney was a Democrat before 1854, but afterwards, McKinney was a Republican. McKinney served as Michigan Secretary of State from 1855 to 1858. McKinney served as Michigan State Treasurer from 1859 to 1860.

Death
McKinney died in Van Buren County on July 10, 1870.

References

1803 births
1870 deaths
Members of the Michigan House of Representatives
Michigan state senators
Secretaries of State of Michigan
People from Pennsylvania
People from Van Buren County, Michigan
Michigan Democrats
Michigan Republicans
State treasurers of Michigan
19th-century American politicians